This is a list of notable residents of Mumbai, India. Residents may be known as Mumbaikars (in Marathi), or Bombayites.

Sport

Cricketers

 Sachin Tendulkar
 Rohit Sharma
 Sunil Gavaskar
 Ajinkya Rahane
 Shreyas Iyer
 Ajit Agarkar
 Madhav Apte
 Pravin Amre
 Sairaj Bahutule
 Sameer Dighe
 Shivam Dube
 Farokh Engineer
 Subhash Gupte
 Wasim Jaffer
 Vinod Kambli
 Dhawal Kulkarni
 Smriti Mandhana
 Ashok Mankad
 Sanjay Manjrekar
 Vijay Manjrekar
 Vijay Merchant
 Sandeep Patil
 Dattu Phadkar
 Ramesh Powar
 Punam Raut
 Jemimah Rodrigues
 Richard Rutnagur
 Ravi Shastri
 Prithvi Shaw
 Eknath Solkar
 Leonard Stileman-Gibbard
 Shardul Thakur
 Polly Umrigar
 Dilip Vengsarkar
 Ajit Wadekar
 Thomas Wainwright
 Suryakumar Yadav

Footballers
 Steven Dias
 Rahul Bheke
 Shilton D'Silva
 Ashutosh Mehta

Field hockey
 Yuvraj Valmiki

Kickboxing
Sarah Avraham, Indian-born Israeli kickboxer, 2014 Women's World Thai-Boxing Champion

Motor racing
 Jehan Daruvala, Formula 2 racing driver

Snooker
 Aditya Mehta, World Games gold medallist

Business

Anil Agarwal
Anil Ambani
 Mukesh Ambani
 Nita Ambani
 Kumar Mangalam Birla
 Kishore Biyani
 Ghulam Bombaywala
 Siby Abraham Kochuputhentharayil Chacko
 Radhakishan Damani
 Adi Godrej
 Sajjan Jindal
 Uday Kotak
 Vurjeevandas Madhowdas
 Anand Mahindra
 Deena Mehta
 Ajay Piramal
 Albert Abdullah David Sassoon
 David Sassoon
 Ronnie Screwvala
 Ratan Tata
 Nusli Wadia

Film

Actors and directors
 Abhishek Bachchan
 Aishwarya Rai Bachchan
 Amitabh Bachchan
 Amruta Khanvilkar
 Amruta Subhash
 Sanjay Leela Bhansali, director
 Tamanna Bhatia
 Ankush Chaudhari
 David Abraham Cheulkar
 Ileana D'Cruz
 Bobby Deol
 Ritesh Deshmukh
 Dev, Bengali actor
 Varun Dhawan
 Madhuri Dixit
 Sanjay Dutt
 Karan Johar
 Swapnil Joshi
 Bhalchandra Kadam, aka Bhau Kadam
 Kajol
 Urmila Kanitkar
 Arjun Kapoor
 Kareena Kapoor
 Karisma Kapoor
 Ranbir Kapoor
 Rinku Rajguru
 Shraddha Kapoor
 Sonam Kapoor
 Sonali Kulkarni
 Sonalee Kulkarni
 Tejashri Pradhan
 Aamir Khan
 Salman Khan
 Dada Kondke
 Mahesh Kothare
 Mahesh Manjrekar
 Ishaa Koppikar
 Vierendrra Lalit, director
 Urmila Matondkar
 Amol Palekar
 Ameesha Patel
 Sachin Pilgaonkar
 Dilip Prabhavalkar
 Hrithik Roshan, actor
 Rakesh Roshan
 Nilesh Sable
 Ashok Saraf
 Subhash Sharma, art director
 Namrata Shirodkar
 Shilpa Shirodkar
 Zenobia Shroff, Indian-American actress and comedienne
 Ranveer Singh
 Shreyas Talpade
 Preity Zinta
 Sai Tamhankar
 Prarthana Behere

Music

Conductors

 Zubin Mehta

Lyricists and singers
 Javed Akhtar
 Aarya Ambekar
 Asha Bhosle
 Rahul Dev Burman
 Ajay–Atul
 Savani Ravindra
 Rohit Raut
 Sadhana Sargam
 Geeta Dutt
 Lata Mangeshkar
 Usha Mangeshkar
 Freddie Mercury
 Mohammed Rafi
 Geetika Varde, classical singer
 Hridaynath Mangeshkar
 Rahul Vaidya
 Vaishali Samant
 Abhijeet Sawant
 Bela Shende

Writers and journalists

 Devyani Chaubal (1942–1995), film journalist and columnist of the 60s and 70s
 Firdaus Kanga
 B. K. Karanjia (1919–2012), film journalist and editor of Filmfare and Screen, chairman of NFDC
 Rudyard Kipling
 Rohinton Mistry
 Gregory David Roberts
 Salman Rushdie
 Melanie Silgardo (born 1956), poet
 Rishi Vohra
 Fareed Zakaria

Others
Troy Costa (born 1975), fashion designer
 Kekoo Gandhy (1920–2012), art gallery owner, founded Gallery Chemould in 1963
 Chandrakala A. Hate, author, feminist, social worker, and professor
 Jamsetjee Jeejebhoy, merchant and philanthropist
 Muhammad Ali Jinnah, lawyer, politician, and the founder of Pakistan
 Abie Nathan, humanitarian and peace activist
 Shibani Dandekar, model, anchor and singer
 Reshma Bombaywala, model, actress and jewellery designer
 Reshma Qureshi, model and vlogger
 Cowasji Jehangir Readymoney, community leader, philanthropist and industrialist
 Sandra Samuel, nanny who saved the life of two-year-old Moshe Holtzberg during the November 2008 Mumbai terrorist attacks
 Vidya Chavan, politician, and the founder of Ghar Hakk Jagruti Parishad
 Ranvir Shah, cultural activist and philanthropist
 Jagannath Shankarshet, philanthropist and educationalist
 Rufus Pereira, Roman Catholic priest and exorcist
 Subhash Sharma, fine artist, creative designer
 Karan Singh (born 1991), Indian magician
 Tarun Tahiliani, fashion designer
 Zakir Naik - Physician, Islamic preacher, founder of Islamic Research Foundation (IRF) and Peace TV
Sameer Wankhede - Indian officer, worked with NCB
 Regan Gurung (born 1969), author, social psychologist and professor at Oregon State University

References 

 
Mumbai
People
Mumbai